The 40th César Awards ceremony, presented by the Académie des Arts et Techniques du Cinéma, honoured the best films of 2014 in France and took place on 20 February 2015 at the Théâtre du Châtelet in Paris. The ceremony was chaired by actor-director Dany Boon, with actor Édouard Baer acting as master of ceremonies for the second time.

The nominations were announced on 28 January 2015 by Édouard Baer and Academy President Alain Terzian. Saint Laurent received the most nominations with ten, followed by Love at First Fight with nine nominations.

In related events, the Médaille d'Or was awarded for the first time at a ceremony held at Monnaie de Paris on 19 January 2015. Luc Besson was honoured by the Academy for his outstanding artistic and entrepreneurial contribution to the French cinema for the past 3 decades. On 16 February 2015, in a ceremony at the Four Seasons Hotel George V, Sylvie Pialat, who produced Timbuktu via Les Films du Worso, was awarded the Prix Daniel Toscan du Plantier for producer of the year for the second consecutive year.

Timbuktu won seven awards including Best Film and Best Director for Abderrahmane Sissako. Other winners included Love at First Fight with three awards, and Yves Saint Laurent, Hippocrate, Clouds of Sils Maria, La Famille Bélier, Diplomacy, Saint Laurent, Beauty and the Beast, The Salt of the Earth, Minuscule: Valley of the Lost Ants, Les Petits Cailloux, La Femme de Rio and Mommy with one.

Winners and nominees

Films with multiple nominations and awards 

The following films received multiple nominations:

The following films received multiple awards:

Presenters

The following individuals, listed in order of appearance, presented awards at the ceremony.

Viewers
The show was followed by 2.3 million viewers. This corresponds to 13.6% of the audience.

See also
 20th Lumières Awards
 5th Magritte Awards
 27th European Film Awards
 87th Academy Awards
 68th British Academy Film Awards

References

External links

 César Awards official website
 
 40th César Awards at AlloCiné

2015
2015 in French cinema
2015 film awards